Needy may refer to: 
 Narcissistic, a person who requires constant attention from others
 Poverty, a persistent lack of material needs
 Needy, Oregon, an unincorporated community in Oregon
 "Needy" (song), an Ariana Grande song on her 2019 album Thank U, Next
"Needy", a song by The Good Life on the 2004 album Album of the Year
Anita "Needy" Lesnicki, a nickname for a fictional character from the 2009 film Jennifer's Body
Needy Guims, retired French sprinter

See also
 Welfare, government support for the needy
 Need (disambiguation)
 Needs (disambiguation)